Kamran Shah Durrani was born in the Sadozai dynasty. He was the son of Mahmud Shah Durrani, grandson of Timur Shah Durrani and the great grandson of Ahmad Shah Durrani, the founder of the Durrani Empire. He was deposed and killed in early 1842, by his vizier Yar Mohammad Khan Alakozai.

Reign
After Timur Shah's death in 1793, Afghanistan fell apart into multiple pieces. Eventually Mahmud Shah took the throne in 1809 and had as vazir Fateh Khan Barakzai. In April 1818, Fateh Khan conquered Herat for Mahmud but he got out of favour with him and thus Mahmud Shah and his son accompanied by allies repaid Fateh Khan's services by having him brutally assassinated in 1818. After the assassination of Fateh Khan Barakzai, the fall of the Durrani Empires had begun. Thus, after a bloody conflict, Mahmud Shah was deprived of all his possessions except Herat. The rest of his dominions were divided among Fateh Khan's brothers. King Mahmud Shah Durrani died in 1829. Herat  was then after ruled by Kamran Shah. In Early 1842, he was deposed and killed in Kohsan on the orders of his Vazir Yar Mohammad Khan Alakozai. Most of his family migrated to Quetta in British India.

See also
 Durrani Empire
 Herat (1793-1863)
 Mahmud Shah Durrani
 Yar Mohammad Khan Alakozai
 Dost Mohammad Khan
 Herat Campaign of 1862-1863

References

External links
Britannica – Timur Shah (ruler of Afghanistan
The British Library – Chronology: from the emergence of the Afghan Kingdom to the Mission of Mountstuart Elphistone, 1747–1809

Year of birth unknown
Year of death unknown
Shahzada
Emirs of Afghanistan
Pashtun people